The Salinan are a Native American tribe whose ancestral territory is in the southern Salinas Valley and the Santa Lucia Range in the Central Coast of California. Today, the Salinan governments are now working toward federal tribal recognition from the Bureau of Indian Affairs.

There were two major divisions, the Miguelino in the south, on the upper course of the Salinas River (which flows south to north), and the Antoniano in the north, in the lower part of the Salinas Basin, corresponding to the two missions in the Salinas Valley (Mission San Antonio de Padua and Mission San Miguel Arcángel). There were also a Playano group on the Pacific Coast in the vicinity of what is now San Simeon and Lucia. Before European contact, Salinans lived by hunting and gathering and, like most other California tribes, were organized in small groups with little centralized political structure.

Etymology
The Salinan people were named after the Salinas River(1856) and John Powell (1891). The people's own name for themselves is the "Te'po'ta'ahl"  or "People of the Oaks," according to current tribal leadership.  C. Hart Merriam called these people the En-'ne-sen on advice from one informant; En-'ne-sen  was the native word for the Salinan headquarters.

Language
The Salinan language, spoken until the 1950s is a language isolate. It may be a part of the  Hokan language family. Sapir included it in a subfamily of Hokan, along with Chumash and Seri; this classification has found its way into more recent encyclopedias and presentations of language families, but serious supporting evidence has never been presented.

Population

Estimates for the pre-contact populations of most native groups in California have varied substantially.  Alfred L. Kroeber put the 1770 population of the Salinan as 3,000. Sherburne F. Cook similarly estimated that there were at least 700 Salinans. The  2000 United States Census reported a total population of Salinan people as 681.

The rock overhangs and caves have fire-scarred roofs that bear evidence of occupancy over hundreds of years. The Wagon Cave Research Natural Area of  contains diverse stands of Valley Oaks of varying ages and densities and has been recommended as a Research Natural Areas within the Los Padres National Forest.

In the late 1800s until the Big Sur Coast Highway was completed in 1937, homesteaders near Lucia and miners in the Los Burros Mining District used Wagon Cave as a resting point and overnight camp site when traveling to and from the coast. Travelers on horseback switched to wagons stored at the caves for the purpose of hauling items to market and provisions back from the railhead in Soledad.

See also
 Salinan traditional narratives
 Kuksu (religion)
 Painted Rock (San Luis Obispo County)
 Chalon
 USS Salinan (ATF-161)

Notes

References

 Cook, Sherburne F. 1976. The Conflict between the California Indian and White Civilization. Berkeley, California: University of California Press.
 Kroeber, Alfred L. 1925. Handbook of the Indians of California. Bureau of American Ethnology Bulletin No. 78. Washington, D.C.
 Hester, Thomas R. 1978. Salinan, in Handbook of North American Indians, vol. 8 (California). William C. Sturtevant, and Robert F. Heizer, eds. Washington, DC: Smithsonian Institution, 1978.  / 0160045754, pages 500-504. 
 Marlett, Stephen A. 2008. The Seri-Salinan connection revisited. International Journal of American Linguistics 74.3:393-399.
 Sapir, Edward. 1925. The Hokan affinity of Subtiaba in Nicaragua. American Anthropologist 27: (3).402-34, (4).491-527.
 National Public Radio segment by Allison Herrera, December 13, 2017

 
Native American tribes in California
California Mission Indians
 
Salinas River (California)
Salinas Valley
Santa Lucia Range
History of Monterey County, California
History of San Luis Obispo County, California
People from Monterey County, California
People from San Luis Obispo County, California